Pertusaria lactea is a species of warty crustose lichens  in the Pertusariaceae family.

These lichens are white to cream or pale grey. They mainly can be found on northern exposed siliceous or calcareous rocks.

This species is present in North America, Arctic, Europe, Asia and South Africa.

References

lactea
Lichen species
Taxa named by Carl Linnaeus
Lichens of the Arctic